The 1908 Tennessee gubernatorial election was held on November 3, 1908. Incumbent Democrat Malcolm R. Patterson defeated Republican nominee G. N. Tillman with 53.73% of the vote.

General election

Candidates
Major party candidates
Malcolm R. Patterson, Democratic
G. N. Tillman, Republican 

Other candidates
W.A. Weatherall, Socialist

Results

References

1908
Tennessee
Gubernatorial